Justice League of America is a 1997 American superhero television film and an unsuccessful pilot produced by CBS and directed by Félix Enríquez Alcalá, based on a team of fictional DC Comics superheroes from the comic of the same name. The film aired on CBS on December 28, 1997. It centers on a female meteorologist who gains superpowers and is later inducted into the "Justice League", while the city of New Metro is held for ransom by a terrorist armed with a weather control device.

The film is interjected with mock-interviews of members of the Justice League, speaking about life as a superhero in the past tense, preceding the events of the film.

Plot  
The protagonist, Tori Olafsdotter, is a meteorologist working at the Eno Meteorological Institute who will later become Ice. The city of New Metro is faced with a tornado controlled by a terrorist calling himself the Weatherman. The Flash dissipates the tornado using his super speed while the other members of the JLA use their powers to save civilians.

Tori stumbles upon a hidden device in the lab where she works. While investigating its use, she spills water on it and it strikes her with strange blue electricity. She is unharmed and leaves the lab for home freezing everything she touches. En route she sees a man drowning; when she attempts to rescue him, the water freezes around her. The JLA, believing her to be the Weatherman, abduct and interrogate her. They release her and Tori believes it was all simply a bad dream.

The JLA suspect that Tori's timid colleague Arliss Hopke is The Weatherman. New Metro is attacked again, this time by golf ball-sized hailstones, but Fire melts them all.  The JLA infiltrate a party at the Eno Meteorological Institute looking for evidence that Arliss Hopke is The Weatherman. Tori however discovers that it is her boss, Dr. Eno, who is The Weatherman.

Tori takes this knowledge to the JLA and they in turn take her to their secret command center, an alien spacecraft hidden underwater. The JLA's leader J'onn J'onzz introduces himself to Tori and the other members of the League reveal their secret identities. Tori discovers that The Atom is a man with whom she has been flirting. The JLA attempt to train Tori to hone her freezing powers without much success.

Martin Walters, a young man who has been pursuing B.B. DaCosta romantically, watches a news broadcast about the JLA and sees that Fire is wearing earrings that he gave B.B. as a gift. Martin tells B.B. that he knows her secret identity. B.B. secretly alerts the JLA, and J'onn takes the shape of Fire and appears before Martin and B.B. "Fire" claims that B.B. is a close friend who lent "her" the earrings. Martin is embarrassed by his "mistake", and B.B. gently terminates his romantic interest in her, although she assures him that he's a nice guy and that he will find true love someday.

The Weatherman demands $20 million or he will engulf New Metro in a tidal wave. He attacks the Watchtower using a heat ray. The JLA escape and devise a plan to stop the Weatherman, leaving Tori behind. They are unsuccessful, but Tori stops it by freezing  the tidal wave solid.

The other heroes apologize for leaving Tori behind, and offer her membership again, including a costume and the codename "Ice".  Tori forgives them and agrees to their offer.

Meanwhile, the Weatherman plans his escape from prison.

Cast 
 Matthew Settle as Guy Gardner / Green Lantern, a software salesman.
 Kim Oja as Tori Olafsdotter / Ice, a meteorologist working at Dr. Eno's Meteorological Institute.
 John Kassir as Ray Palmer / The Atom, a science teacher.
 Michelle Hurd as B.B. DaCosta / Fire, a struggling actress.
 Kenny Johnston as Barry Allen / The Flash, unemployed.
 David Krumholtz as Martin Walters, an actor who has a crush on B.B.
 Elisa Donovan as Cheryl, Guy's girlfriend.
 Ron Pearson as Dr. Arliss Hopke, one of Tori's colleagues.
 David Ogden Stiers as J'onn J'onzz / Martian Manhunter, the leader of the JLA.
 Miguel Ferrer as Dr. Eno / The Weather Man, a rival meteorologist.
 Jason Weissbrod as Drazen

Production 

The film's plot is based on the Justice League comic era of Keith Giffen & J. M. DeMatteis (writers). It was filmed in Vancouver, British Columbia, Canada.

Reception 
Reviews of the film have been negative. Common complaints are of the plot holes, poor special effects, bad costumes and that the League members deviated heavily from their source characters. Critics have also said the movie tried to be like "Friends with superpowers". Established JLA writer Mark Waid said the film was "80 minutes of my life I'll never get back".

Release 
Justice League of America aired on CBS in the United States on December 28, 1997. It has been shown on television in the UK (Channel 5), Puerto Rico's WAPA-TV (Channel 4), Thailand (Cinemax), Brazil (SBT), Uruguay, Poland (TVN, TVN 7, TV4), Mexico (TV Azteca), South Africa (e.tv), Germany, India and Israel. Bootleg copies have been distributed through conventions, websites and file sharing networks.

See also 
 Aquaman
 Birds of Prey
 The Flash
 Legends of the Superheroes

References

External links

 Trailer & Screenshots

1997 television films
1997 films
1997 action films
1990s English-language films
1990s superhero films
Action television films
American superhero films
CBS network films
Films directed by Félix Enríquez Alcalá
Films scored by John Debney
Films shot in Vancouver
Justice League films
Television films as pilots
Television pilots not picked up as a series
1990s American films